Gros noir is the synonym for several wine grape varieties including:

Camaraou noir
César (grape)
Grand Noir de la Calmette
Peloursin
Trollinger